Kaip is a rural locality (a selo) and the administrative center of Kaipsky Selsoviet of Klyuchevsky District, Altai Krai, Russia. The population was 467 as of 2016. There are 7 streets.

Geography 
Kaip is located on the north bank of the Bulduk Lake, 47 km east of Klyuchi (the district's administrative centre) by road. Petukhi is the nearest rural locality.

References 

Rural localities in Klyuchevsky District